The Boathouse, located at 116 Gordon Street in Guelph, Ontario, is a single-story wood frame recreational facility that was constructed beside Speed River around 1930. It was built for Edward Johnson, an opera singer from Guelph. Since its construction, the Boathouse has been used not only to shelter boats, but also as a concession stand, a dance hall, and a Navy Cadet Headquarters. The Boathouse has been used as a venue for aquatic recreation in Guelph for more than 130 years,.

History

1800s 

It is believed that the first boat house was constructed in 1876 by a Mr. O Coulson. In 1879, Edward McKeague opened a boat rental business operating out of the boat house and by 1885, William Johnson, the uncle of opera singer, Edward Johnson, took over as manager of the boat house. The boat house was dependent on the Gow dam forming a pool of water in the river.

In 1895, the Speed Canoe Club was formed and met in a hall every Thursday evening above William Johnson's boat house. The members canoed a mile and a half up river to Victoria Park and returning at midnight, they formed an armada, locking arms and canoes together, singing together until they reached the boat house. During William Johnson's proprietorship of the boat house, the Speed Canoe club was an active social and sporting organizations with a membership of 250 people between 1895 and 1900.

1900s 

The 1930 model of the Boathouse was not the first structure of its kind to be built. Historically, Guelph's first Boathouse was built in 1876. At this time, James Johnson, father of famous tenor Edward Johnson, was the manager of the boat rental business located at the Boathouse. In 1885, management duties shifted to James's brother William, under whose leadership the Speed Canoe Club was created. Located on Speed River beside the Boathouse, the Speed Canoe Club is considered to be one of Guelph's most active social and sporting organizations, and to this day it continues to be a popular venue for boaters and aquatic enthusiasts alike. The Boathouse was used by the Navy League of Canada during World War II, serving as the main headquarters for the Sea Cadets until 1993. At that point, the building had fallen into disrepair. The Sea Cadet unit relocated to new quarters on Cardigan Street, and the city announced its intention to demolish the building and level the land in order to create more parking spots for the Guelph Lawn Bowling Club.

However, some residents argued that the building should be preserved as an historic structure. Restaurateurs made a deal with the city to restore the heritage structure in exchange for a long-term lease at nominal rent. A newer addition at the rear, which had been storage space when the Sea Cadets occupied the building, was demolished, leaving only the 1930s structure.

2000s to present 

In June 2011, the Boathouse celebrated two milestones: its declaration of 135 years since it was founded and its celebration of 15 years since its reopening as an ice cream parlor and tea room.

In celebration of the Boathouse's double milestone, the owner openly discussed their commitment to the Boathouse. In 1997, renovations to restore the historic building totaled $100,000, and an enticing 10-year rental agreement with the City of Guelph was reached.

Notes

External links 

Buildings and structures in Guelph
Sports venues in Ontario
Designated heritage properties in Ontario